Akaltara railway station is a small railway station in Janjgir–Champa district, Chhattisgarh. Its code is AKT. It serves Akaltara city. The station consists of two platforms. The platforms are not well sheltered. It lacks facilities of sanitation. Akaltara is a station on the Tatanagar–Bilaspur section of Howrah–Nagpur–Mumbai line.

Major trains
 South Bihar Express

References

Railway stations in Janjgir-Champa district
Bilaspur railway division